Colehouse Lane railway station served the town of Clevedon, North Somerset, England, from 1897 to 1940 on the Weston, Clevedon and Portishead Railway.

History 
The station opened on 1 December 1897 by the Weston, Clevedon and Portishead Railway. It was moved to the other side of the line in 1939 to make space for the BBC transmitter. The station closed on 20 May 1940.

References

External links 

Disused railway stations in Somerset
Railway stations in Great Britain opened in 1897
Railway stations in Great Britain closed in 1940
1897 establishments in England
1940 disestablishments in England